Stenidea albida is a species of beetle in the family Cerambycidae. It was described by Brullé in 1838, originally under the genus Cerambyx. It is known from the Canary Islands. It feeds on Euphorbia aphylla Euphorbia balsamifera Euphorbia canariensis, and Euphorbia regis-jubae.

References

albida
Beetles described in 1838